Ann Aguirre is an American author of speculative fiction.  She writes urban fantasy, romantic science fiction, apocalyptic paranormal romance (with co-author Carrie Lofty as Ellen Connor), paranormal romantic suspense (as Ava Gray), and post-apocalyptic dystopian young adult fiction.

Personal life
Aguirre has a degree in English literature and lives in Mexico with her husband and children.

Bibliography 
In alphabetical order by series.

2B Trilogy 
New adult romance

 I Want It That Way (2014)
 As Long As You Love Me (2014)
 The Shape of My Heart (2014)

Apparatus Infernum 
Steampunk noir as A.A. Aguirre, with Andres Aguirre

Bronze Gods (May 2013)
Silver Mirrors (May 2014)

Ars Numina Series 
Paranormal romance

 The Leopard King (2016)
 The Demon Prince (2017)
 The Wolf Lord (2018)

Corine Solomon Series 
Urban fantasy

Blue Diablo (2009)
Hell Fire (2010)
Shady Lady (2011)
Devil's Punch (2012)
Agave Kiss (2013)

 "Forbidden Fruit" (2013, novella)

Dark Age Dawning Series 
Apocalyptic romance with Carrie Lofty as Ellen Connor

Nightfall (2011)
Midnight (2011)
Daybreak (2011)

Dread Queen Series
Science fiction set in the Sirantha Jax Series universe

Perdition (2013)
Havoc (2014)
Breakout (2015)

The Honors series 
Young adult science fiction with Rachel Caine

Honor Among Thieves (2018)
Honor Bound (2019)
Honor Lost (2020)

The Immortal Game Trilogy 
Paranormal YA

Mortal Danger (2014)
Public Enemies (2015)
Infinite Risk (2016)

 "The Girl in the Gray Sweatshirt" (2014, short story)

The Razorland Series 
Young-adult fiction

Enclave (2011)
Outpost (September 4, 2012)
Horde (September 2013)
Vanguard (July 25, 2017 )

 "Foundation" (2012, short story)
 "Endurance" (2012, short story)
 "Restoration" (2013, short story)

Sirantha Jax Series 
Science fiction

 Grimspace (2008)
 Wanderlust (2008)
 Doubleblind (2009)
 Killbox (2010)
 Aftermath (2011)
 Endgame (2012)

The Skin Series 
Paranormal romantic suspense as Ava Gray

 Skin Game (2009)
 Skin Tight (2010)
 Skin Heat (2011)
 Skin Dive (2011)

Other novels 
 Stone Maiden (2009, BoD and Free PDF Download under Creative Commons Attribution-Noncommercial-No Derivative Works 3.0 United States License)

 Thistle & Thorne (February 2013)

 The Queen of Bright and Shiny Things (2015)

 Like Never and Always (2018)
Heartwood Box (2019)

Anthologies 
 Primal (2011), as Ava Gray with Lora Leigh, Michelle Rowen and Jory Strong
 'Til the World Ends (2013), with Julie Kagawa and Karen Duvall
 Fierce Reads: Kisses and Curses (2015), ed. Lauren Burniac

Short fiction 
 Circle Unbroken (2009)
 Princes of Dominion (2010)
 Skin & Bone (2011)
 Wild Magic (2011)
 Endurance (2012)

References

External links 
 Ann Aguirre's official Website
 official Website as Ava Gray
 official Website as Ellen Connor
 
 List of Works at Fantastic Fiction

Living people
21st-century American novelists
American emigrants to Mexico
American science fiction writers
American fantasy writers
American women novelists
1970 births
Women science fiction and fantasy writers
21st-century American women writers
RITA Award winners
Women romantic fiction writers
American romantic fiction writers